Luís Gustavo "Gus" Ledes Evangelista dos Santos (born 28 September 1992), sometimes known as Luís Gustavo, is a Portuguese professional footballer who plays for Cypriot club AEK Larnaca FC as a central midfielder.

Club career
Born in Braga, Portugal, to Marcílio Santos, a Brazilian who played ten years in the country with five clubs, Ledes joined FC Barcelona's youth academy in 2006 at nearly 14. He was promoted to the B team five years later.

Ledes made his official debut for the side on 29 October 2011, in a 1–0 home win against Gimnàstic de Tarragona in the Segunda División. On 3 June 2012, in the season's last round, he scored his first professional goal, starting and contributing to a 6–0 away rout of Xerez CD.

On 30 May 2013, Ledes' contract expired and he was told by the Catalans that he would be released. He returned to Portugal on 11 July, signing a four-year deal with Rio Ave FC.

On 22 December 2015, after failing to appear in any competitive games in the first part of the campaign, Ledes joined RC Celta de Vigo, being assigned to the reserves. On 10 July 2017, he returned to the second division after agreeing to a contract with CF Reus Deportiu.

Ledes and the rest of the squad left halfway through 2018–19, after it was expelled by the Liga de Fútbol Profesional. On 30 January 2019, he joined CD Numancia until June 2021.

On 27 August 2020, after suffering relegation, Ledes signed a three-year deal with second-tier newcomers CD Castellón.

International career
Ledes won his first cap for Portugal at the under-21 level on 14 November 2012, playing the second half of the 3–2 friendly victory over Scotland in Setúbal.

Career statistics

References

External links

1992 births
Living people
Portuguese people of Brazilian descent
Sportspeople from Braga
Portuguese footballers
Association football midfielders
Segunda División players
Segunda División B players
FC Barcelona players
FC Barcelona Atlètic players
Celta de Vigo B players
CF Reus Deportiu players
CD Numancia players
CD Castellón footballers
Primeira Liga players
Rio Ave F.C. players
Cypriot First Division players
AEK Larnaca FC players
Portugal youth international footballers
Portugal under-21 international footballers
Portuguese expatriate footballers
Expatriate footballers in Spain
Expatriate footballers in Cyprus
Portuguese expatriate sportspeople in Spain
Portuguese expatriate sportspeople in Cyprus